Malta participated in the 2010 Summer Youth Olympics in Singapore.

Medalists

Athletics

Girls
Track and Road Events

Judo

Individual

Team

Swimming

References

External links
Competitors List: Malta – Singapore 2010 official site

Nations at the 2010 Summer Youth Olympics
2010 in Maltese sport
Malta at the Youth Olympics